John Dingle may refer to:

 John Holmes Dingle (1908–1973), American physician and medical professor
 John T. Dingle (born before 1959), British biologist
 Johnny Dingle (born 1984), American football player
 Jon Dingle, a character in Emmerdale

See also
 John Dingell Sr. (1894–1955), U.S. Representative from Michigan (served 1933–1955)
 John Dingell (1926–2019), U.S. Representative from Michigan (served 1955–2015)